Tõnu Kõrvits (born 9 April 1969 in Tallinn) is an Estonian composer.

In 1994 he graduated from the Estonian Academy of Music and Theatre with specialty in composition.

Since 2001 he has taught composition and instrumentation at the Estonian Academy of Music and Theatre.

Since 1994 he has been a member of the Estonian Composers' Union.

Awards:
 2001: Heino Eller Music Prize
 2016: Order of the White Star, 3rd Class
 2018: Lepo Sumera Award for Composition

Works
 2004: chamber opera “Stabat Mater”

 2005: chamber opera "My Swans, My Thoughts"
 2006: chamber opera "Firegarden"

References

Living people
1969 births
21st-century Estonian composers
Estonian Academy of Music and Theatre alumni
Academic staff of the Estonian Academy of Music and Theatre
Recipients of the Order of the White Star, 3rd Class
People from Tallinn